Dabarella is a small town in Sri Lanka. It is located within Southern Province.
The peak temperature on October 30, 2013 was 32 °C.

See also
List of towns in Southern Province, Sri Lanka

External links

Populated places in Southern Province, Sri Lanka